The Hart-Jaune Dam is a dam in Quebec, Canada.
It crosses the Hart Jaune River where it leaves the Petit lac Manicouagan.
It regulates the flow of water to the 45.5 MW Hart-Jaune generating station.

Location

The Hart-Jaune Dam is in the unorganized territory of Rivière-Mouchalagane in  Caniapiscau Regional County Municipality.
Below the dam the Hart Jaune River flows through Lac Uishaukaniss and through a secondary dam into the power plant's reservoir.
It enters the Hart-Jaune generating station at the southwest end of the reservoir.
The dam is crossed by the Cartier Railway, which runs along the south shore of Petit lac Manicouagan.
An access road leads from Quebec Route 389 up the river to the lower dam, and continues to the upper dam on the lake.
The road is kept open year-round.

History

The dam and power plant have their origin on 26 January 1957 when the Québec Cartier Mining Company was created by U.S. Steel to supply iron ore concentrate.
On 21 February 1957 the Queen, with the advice and consent to the Legislative Council and the Legislative Assembly of Quebec, authorized leasing the water powers of the Hart-Jaune River and the Petit Lac Manicouagan, including the right to regulate the flow of the river and to store water in the lake.
The new company spent $325 million to build the Lake Jeannine mining site, with the nearby town of Gagnon and Hart-Jaune power station, as well as the Cartier Railway leading to a port at Port-Cartier from which the first load of iron ore concentrate was shipped in June 1961.

The company made further investments in the 1970s at Mont-Wright, Fermont and Fire Lake, but during a steel market crisis in 1979−1985 was forced to shut down Lac-Jeannine, Gagnon and Fire Lake.
Hart Jaune was listed among Hydro Quebec's generating stations in 1987.

In 2012 Hydro Quebec commissioned a digital microwave link between Hart-Jaune and Manic-5.
In July 2013 Hydro Quebec evacuated its personnel from the power station as a precautionary measure due to a major forest fire in the area.

Main dam

The upper dam was built in 1960. It is operated by Hydro-Québec.
It is in the basin of the Beaupré River, a tributary of the Manicouagan Reservoir.

Other structures

There is an intermediate dam between Lac Uishaukaniss and the reservoir of the power plant.
This dam carries the railway leading to Lake Jeannine, once the main line of the Cartier Railway.
These include four dykes, a secondary dam that provides a high-water outlet for the river, and the water intake dam that feeds the power station.

Generating station

The Hart-Jaune generating station has an installed capacity of 51 MW from 3 turbines. 
It came into service in 1960.
In January the plant has a dependable maximum net capacity of 48 MW.
In an emergency the Hart Jaune Power plant, which is connected to the Hydro-Quebec grid, can supply enough power for the essential processing facilities in ArcelorMittal's Mont-Wright facility.

Notes

Citations

Sources

Dams in Quebec
Hydro-Québec
Publicly owned dams in Canada